Ismael Gómez Falcón (born 24 April 1984) is a Spanish professional footballer who plays as a goalkeeper for Atlético Sanluqueño CF.

Club career
Falcón was born in Cádiz, Andalusia. After beginning his football career at local Cádiz CF he was signed by Atlético Madrid aged 20 to finish his development, and he eventually battled for second-choice status for two seasons with another club graduate, Iván Cuéllar, appearing in five La Liga matches in 2005–06, the first being a 1–1 away draw against Athletic Bilbao on 3 December 2005 where he replaced the injured Leo Franco; he also represented the reserves during his tenure.

After a small loan stint in the Segunda División with Hércules CF, Falcón was released (as Cuéllar) in July 2008 and joined another club at that level, RC Celta de Vigo. He continued playing in that league afterwards, with Hércules, AD Alcorcón, Córdoba CF and CD Tenerife.

Career statistics

Club

References

External links

Stats and bio at Cadistas1910 
Celta de Vigo biography 

1984 births
Living people
Spanish footballers
Footballers from Cádiz
Association football goalkeepers
La Liga players
Segunda División players
Segunda División B players
Primera Federación players
Cádiz CF B players
Atlético Madrid B players
Atlético Madrid footballers
Hércules CF players
RC Celta de Vigo players
AD Alcorcón footballers
Córdoba CF players
CD Tenerife players
Atlético Sanluqueño CF players